The Aviasud Mistral is a French two-seat ultralight biplane built by Aviasud Engineering. This plane is notable as it has forward swept wings and side-by-side seating.  The lower wings are movable and are used as the roll control (wing leveler).

The aeroplane (along with the Sirocco) was taken over, and is still supported by, Aériane in 1989.

Design and development

The Aviasud Mistral was designed by two Belgian engineers, Francois Goethals and Bernard d'Otreppe.

The prototype first flew in May 1985, and the aircraft entered production with AviaSud engineering in Fréjus, with the first production model having its maiden flight in February 1986.  Aviasud has built more than 200 Mistrals, it has also been built by Ultraleger Industria Aeronáutica Ltda in Brasil.

The Mistral is a biplane of mixed wooden and composite construction, with forward swept wings, with the all-moving lower wings used as large ailerons, and a conventional, all-moving tailplane. It has a fixed tricycle landing gear and a nose-mounted Rotax piston engine. The Mistral has an enclosed cockpit with two side-by-side seats forward of the wings.

On May 4, 1987, an Aviasud Mistral was flown to the geographic North Pole by Nicolas Hulot, a world first for this type of aircraft.

Variants

Mistral
Original version with 47 kW Rotax 532 engine.
Mistral 503
Low powered, economy version with 37 kW (50 hp) Rotax 503 engine. 
AE 206 Mistral
Basic version, powered by 48 kW (64 hp) Rotax 582 engine.
AE 206 US
"Ultra Silent" version with larger, lower geared propeller. 
AE 207 Mistral Twin
Twin engined version for advertising and surveillance work, with additional, pusher Rotax 503 engine above wing. 30 built by 1999.

Specifications (AE 206)

References

Notes

Bibliography
 Lambert, Mark (ed.). Jane's All The World's Aircraft 1993-94. Coulsdon, UK: Jane's Data Division, 1993. .
 Taylor, John W.R. Jane's All The World's Aircraft 1988-89. Jane's Defence Data, 1988. .  
 Taylor, Michael J.H. (ed.). Brassey's World Aircraft & Systems Directory 1999/2000. London:Brassey's, 1999. .
 (in Dutch)

1980s French ultralight aircraft
Light-sport aircraft
Single-engined tractor aircraft
Biplanes
Aircraft first flown in 1985
Forward-swept-wing aircraft